The 2011–12 Telekom S-League was the 9th season of the Telekom S-League in the Solomon Islands. Solomon Warriors won the championship for the first time and also qualified as the Solomon Islands representative for the 2012–13 OFC Champions League. All matches were played at the hillside ground called Lawson Tama Stadium, with an approximate capacity of 20,000.

Teams
 Hana (Honiara)
 Koloale (Honiara)
 KOSSA (Honiara)
 Malaita Kingz (Malaita)
 Marist Fire (Honiara)
 Real Kakamora (Makira-Ulawa)
 Solomon Warriors (Honiara)
 Western United (Western)

Standings

[ * ] Solomon Warriors did not advance to the Solomon Islands playoff for the 2012–13 OFC Champions League because they also won the 2012 Knockout Championship.

References

Solomon Islands S-League seasons
Solomon
football
Solomon
football